Russian Roulette is the third Korean extended play by South Korean girl group Red Velvet. It was released on September 7, 2016, by SM Entertainment.

The album is the group's second 'Red' and 'Velvet' album, after releasing Ice Cream Cake in 2015. The EP consists of seven tracks, including the lead single "Russian Roulette".

Background and release
Despite earlier reports of Red Velvet having a summer comeback, S.M. Entertainment announced that the group will release a new album in September. Member and leader Irene talked about the difficulties the group faced while preparing for the album on the September 9 broadcast of the radio show Super Junior's Kiss the Radio and stated that it was "physically and mentally tiring as the comeback date kept getting postponed".

After revealing the first teaser on September 1, they announced that the group will release their third extended play on September 7, with 7 tracks in the album. They revealed the album was to be called Russian Roulette, the same name as its title track.

Composition
The title track "Russian Roulette" is a synth-pop song that has an arcade sound feel with a retro 8-bit sound source. The song was produced by Albi Albertsson, Belle Humble and Markus Lindell who also had a part in producing their previous album's title track "One of These Nights". Its lyrics compare the process of winning someone's heart with a game of Russian roulette. On the September 13 broadcast of SBS Power FM radio show "Choi Hwa-jung's Power Time", the members revealed that the song was written before they debuted. They heard the song then, when they were still trainees, not realizing they would release it.

"Lucky Girl" is a retro-style dance-pop song produced by Hayley Aitken and Ollipop with lyrics written by Kenzie. "Bad Dracula" was produced by Tomas Smågesjø, Choi Jin-Suk & Nermin Harambasic from Dsign Music and American singer-songwriter Courtney Woolsey with lyrics by Jo Yun-gyeong, who also wrote the lyrics of the title track. "Sunny Afternoon" is a 90s throwback, slick song and is produced by Swedish producers Simon Petrén & Andreas Öberg, Maja Keuc and Kim One with Korean lyrics written by Jeong Ju Hee. "Fool" is an acoustic pop song written by 1월8일 of Jam Factory and composed by Malin Johansson and Josef Melin. "Some Love" is a tropical house song written and produced by Kenzie, while "My Dear" was written and produced by Hwang Hyun of MonoTree.

Promotion
Red Velvet held a special countdown to the release of their album through the Naver V app on September 6, just an hour before the release of "Russian Roulette"'s music video and the album. The group started their music show promotions on September 8, on M! Countdown, performing "Russian Roulette" and "Lucky Girl". This was followed by performances on Music Bank and Inkigayo where they also performed both songs.

Critical reception
Billboard's Tamar Herman wrote that the song was "more saccharine than their typical sound" and described the music video as a "bubbly, athletic-themed music video that offered fun times for all as a murderous ode to The Simpsons''' impish duo Itchy and Scratchy." It ranked 6th on Dazed Digital's 20 Best K-pop Tracks of the Year. Taylor Glasby commented that the video "has a sinister combination of sweetness and threat" and called the song "devilishly satisfying".

Bradley Stern of PopCrush called the title track a "perky, retro-sounding electro-pop tune" that was expected from most k-pop idols, and praised the black comedy in the song's music video. He compared it to the film Jawbreaker and said it's "pretty genius".

Commercial performance
The album peaked at No. 2 on Billboard's World Albums Chart and peaked at No. 18 on Heatseekers Albums chart, their highest to date. The title track "Russian Roulette" also charted at No. 2 on World Digital Songs, making it their highest ranking on the chart. The album debuted at no. 1 on South Korea's Gaon Album Chart, with "Russian Roulette" charting at no. 3 on its Weekly Digital Chart, before rising to no. 2 a week later. All of the album's other tracks also charted.South Korea's Weekly Gaon Digital Chart September 11-17, 2016 (in Korean) Originally from Gaon Music Chart (September 2016). Retrieved on September 25, 2016. "Russian Roulette" became the most viewed K-pop music video for the month of September in America and worldwide. The album peaked at number 63 on the Billboard Japan Hot Albums for the week of September 19, 2016.

The group won their first music show trophy for "Russian Roulette" on the September 13 broadcast of The Show.

Track listing

Personnel
Credits adapted from the liner notes of Russian Roulette''.

 Lee Soo-manproducer
 Jeong Eun-kyeongrecording engineer
 Kim Hyun-gonrecording engineer
 Jang Woo-youngrecording engineer
 Lee Ji-hongrecording engineer
 Hwang Hyunrecording engineer
 Lee Ju-youngrecording engineer
 Choo Dae-kwanrecording engineer assistant
 Nam Koong-jin (SM Concert Hall Studio)mixing engineer
 Koo Jong-pil (Beat Burger) (SM Yellow Tail Studio)mixing engineer
 Kim Cheol-soon (SM Blue Ocean Studio)mixing engineer
 Jeong Ui-seok (SM Blue Cup Studio)mixing engineer
 Tom Coyne (Sterling Sound)master engineer
 Min Hee-jincreative director
 Shin Hee-wonmusic video director
 Min Hee-jindesign
 Jo Woo-cheolGraphic design
 Kim Ye-minGraphic design
 Kim Ju-youngGraphic design
 Kim Han-kyeolGraphic design
 No Hae-nastylist
 Jeong Seon-eehair stylist
 Kim Ji-youngmake-up artist
 Kim Yong-minexecutive supervisor
 Red Velvetvocals
 Irenevocals
 Seulgivocals
 Wendyvocals
 Joyvocals
 Yerivocals

Charts

Weekly charts

Monthly charts

Accolade

Year-end awards

Release history

References

Red Velvet (group) EPs
2016 EPs
SM Entertainment EPs
Korean-language EPs
Pop music EPs